Richard K. Ferguson (August 3, 1931 – May 24, 1986) was a bronze medal winner and Canadian record breaker in the "Miracle Mile" race at the 1954 British Empire and Commonwealth Games, born in Calgary. He attended the University of Iowa. He won the Lionel Conacher Award in 1954. His son, with Canadian swimmer Kathleen McNamee, is Australian-born Canadian actor John Pyper-Ferguson.

References

External links
 Sports-Reference.com

1931 births
1986 deaths
Canadian male middle-distance runners
Athletes from Calgary
Olympic track and field athletes of Canada
Athletes (track and field) at the 1952 Summer Olympics
Athletes (track and field) at the 1950 British Empire Games
Athletes (track and field) at the 1954 British Empire and Commonwealth Games
Commonwealth Games bronze medallists for Canada
Commonwealth Games medallists in athletics
Iowa Hawkeyes men's track and field athletes
Medallists at the 1954 British Empire and Commonwealth Games